Nucleus is a twin-stick shooter with puzzle elements for the PlayStation 3 available through the PlayStation Store. It was released as Bacterius in Japan.

Gameplay
Players are tasked with ridding a host body of a virus infestation, moving through the body's three main biological systems, the digestive system, the circulatory system, and finally the nervous system, culminating in a final battle in the brain.

The basic game consists of shooting bacteria or progressively larger and larger viruses, which break down into smaller viruses when shot, or if left alone combine themselves into ever larger viruses. Each level also has a number of cells which clump together and interact in a physical manner; the players can move them around and manipulate them with a traction beam to construct barriers to hide behind or to block of parts of the dynamically changing levels.

The main resource available to the player is protein, these are released each time an enemy or a cell is destroyed. By clumping cells together the player can harvest more protein, creating a trade off between using the cells available to protect their ship and shooting them to release enough protein to be able to fire the more powerful protein bomb weapon.

Interspersed along the game progression are encounters with super enemies (the Nucleus of the game title). These boss-type enemies fire spores at cells to turn them into bacteria, and can only be damaged by protein bombs. The player has to attempt to maintain a cell barrier between itself and the possibly multiple, possibly mobile Nucleus enemies, while harvesting as much protein as possible in order to fight them back. As the Nucleus enemies get damaged they become more and more violent, producing more spore and eventually attacking the player directly.

The game entities are all physically dynamic, each imparting a force on other nearby entities. Cells exert an attractive force on each other, clumping into a tesselating mass and reacting to the various forces in the game as a flexing and spongy whole. Exploding protein bombs or angry Nucleus enemies exert a large force over a wide area, which can break the various arrangements of cells the player may have constructed to fend off bacteria or virus. There is a sense of zombie pressure as the number of enemies build up and the player tries to keep their defences intact while harvesting protein fast enough.

Other styles of level are also offered—some levels require the player to move cells from one section of the level to another to complete them, some are straight shootouts with no Nucleus enemies, or collect'em-ups in a dynamic environment. There are survival levels where the player is given a source of cells and have to keep back a more and more quickly expanding herd of bacteria and virus by arranging the cells in a free-form way.

The game can be played in a 2-player co-operative mode offering more ways to build and manipulate cell structures or to distract and defeat the Nucleus enemies.

Ultimately the game is a high-score attack. Each level is tuned so that certain advanced techniques have to be used in order to achieve the higher scores, with correspondingly higher grades given to mark progress. These techniques are all discoverable to begin with, but they aren't explained in the initial instruction set. Later levels force you to learn these techniques, hints for failed attempts point the way, and by going back to earlier levels you can more easily achieve the higher level grades.

A patch has been released which offers a new mode of play, Nucleus+, which speeds up the gameplay, tweaks most of the existing levels (of which there are over 40), and introduces some new ones.

References

External links
 Nucleus Game Page, 1UP 8 April 2020

2007 video games
Twin-stick shooters
PlayStation 3-only games
PlayStation Network games
Sony Interactive Entertainment games
Video games developed in the United Kingdom
PlayStation 3 games